Sir Ewen Cameron  (23 June 1841 – 10 December 1908) was a Scottish merchant banker and chartered accountant of the late 19th century, who rose to be chairman of Hong Kong and Shanghai Bank in London.
He played a key role in arranging loans from the Rothschild family to the Empire of Japan during the Russo-Japanese War. 

He is the patrilineal great great grandfather of David Cameron.

Early life and family

Cameron was born in Inverness-shire, Scotland, the eldest child of William Cameron (b. 4 February 1806 at Abertarff) of Upper Muckovie, near Culloden by Croy, by his wife (m. 16 June 1840), Catherine Cameron (b. 22 January 1809), daughter of Ewen Cameron (1775–1842), a farmer and kinsman of Tomchrasky, Glen Moriston and Helen McDonnell (1776–1861).

Career
In 1859, Cameron joined the Caledonian Bank in Aberdeen as an accounting clerk. After qualifying as a chartered accountant he was posted to the Bank of Hindustan, China and Japan before being transferred to Hong Kong in 1866. His abilities, described as "remarkable" by The Times, helped him to land a senior position with the newly formed Hong Kong and Shanghai Bank after the Bank of Hindustan went into liquidation.

A chartered accountant, Cameron became principal agent to the Calcutta branch of HSBC, following which he acted as manager of its Shanghai branch, where he served until 1890. Cameron's success in reorganizing the bank was rewarded by his appointment as a director before he returned to Britain, where he became chairman of the bank in the City of London.

Cameron was appointed KCMG at the end of 1901 for his "services to overseas banking", and was elected a Fellow of the Royal Geographical Society (FRGS) in February 1902.

During 1904 Cameron and other leading London financiers – including Lord Revelstoke of Baring Bros., Arthur Francis Levita and W. M. Koch of Panmure Gordon (Levita's daughter Enid would later marry Cameron's grandson Ewen Donald Cameron in 1930), Sir Marcus Samuel (later Viscount Bearsted) of Samuel Samuel & Co and  Royal Dutch Shell, Sir Carl Meyer, and Otto Kahn – took part in negotiations with the Japanese central banker Takahashi Korekiyo (later Prime Minister of Japan) for the selling of war bonds to finance the Japanese war effort during the Russo-Japanese War.

Marriage and issue
In 1878, Cameron married Josephine Elizabeth (born at Shotford, Norfolk in 1857), daughter of John Houchen of Thetford, Norfolk (Wereham, Norfolk, c. 1818 – Thetford, Norfolk, 6 October 1898) by his wife (m. St James's, Westminster, 29 November 1845) Susannah Vautier (Stanton, Suffolk, c. 1819 – Thetford, Norfolk, 1859), by whom he had five children.

His eldest son, Ewen Allan Cameron, senior partner in Panmure Gordon & Co. and member of the Council of Foreign Bondholders (who died 14 November 1937 in Vienna) was the great-grandfather of David Cameron, Conservative Party Leader (2005–2016) and British Prime Minister (2010–2016).

Death
After suffering bouts of ill health in 1903 and at the end of 1904, Sir Ewen retired in February 1905 and later died at home in Hampstead NW3 on 10 December 1908 at the age of 67.

Coat of arms

See also 
 Clan Cameron
 Cameron baronets
The Prize: The Epic Quest for Oil, Money, and Power

Notes

External links 
 www.cameronhighlandsinfo.com
 www.scottish-places.info
 Burke's Landed Gentry of Scotland
 Memoir of Colonel John Cameron (family cousin)

1841 births
1908 deaths
People from Aberdeen
19th-century Scottish people
English people of Scottish descent
Ewen
British expatriates in India
English expatriates in Japan
British expatriates in China
British bankers
Knights Commander of the Order of St Michael and St George
Fellows of the Royal Geographical Society
People from Inverness
19th-century Scottish businesspeople